Mauritania has sent Olympians to every celebration of the modern Summer Olympic Games held since 1984, and has yet to win an Olympic medal. Mauritania has also yet to compete in any Winter Olympic Games.

The National Olympic Committee was formed in 1962 and recognized by the International Olympic Committee in 1979. Mauritania's debut female Olympian was Fatou Dieng, who competed in the 2000 Summer Olympics.

Medal tables

Medals by Summer Games

See also
 List of flag bearers for Mauritania at the Olympics
 Mauritania at the Paralympics

External links